The Walter Cliff Ranch District, at 7635 Old HW 395 in Washoe Valley, Nevada is a historic site that was listed as a historic district on the National Register of Historic Places in 1985.  It has significance dating from c.1870, when the house was built.  The listing included two contributing buildings: the house and a root cellar/residence building.

It was deemed significant as the only surviving agricultural complex in Washoe Valley that had supplied foodstuffs (fruit, vegetables, dairy products, and hay) to the Comstock Mining District. As of 1985, only eight of many 19th century ranches had any surviving remnants from that era.

Four additional structures on the property, including a garage and two sheds, dating from the early 20th century, are deemed non-contributing but are compatible with the historic usage and feel of the property.

References 

National Register of Historic Places in Nevada
Gothic Revival architecture in Nevada
Buildings and structures completed in 1873
Washoe County, Nevada
Ranches on the National Register of Historic Places in Nevada
Historic districts on the National Register of Historic Places in Nevada